Perfugas (Gallurese: Pelfica) is a comune (municipality) in the Province of Sassari in the Italian region Sardinia, located about  north of Cagliari and about  northeast of Sassari.

Perfugas borders the following municipalities: Bortigiadas, Bulzi, Chiaramonti, Erula, Laerru, Martis, Santa Maria Coghinas, Tempio Pausania.

Sights include the church of Santa Maria degli Angeli (16th-17tj centuries), home to the so-called retablo of San Giorgio, one of the largest altarpieces in Sardinia,  the Catalan Gothic-style church of San Giorgio, and the so-called "Sacred Pit of Predio Canopoli", a nuraghe era archaeological site.

References

Cities and towns in Sardinia